The Tunisian Handball Federation (FTHB), is the national handball association in Tunisia. FTHB organizes team handball within Tunisia and represents Tunisian handball internationally. The federation is a member of the Arab Handball Federation, Mediterranean Handball Confederation, African Handball Confederation (CAHB) and the International Handball Federation (IHF). The president of FTHB is Karim Helali.

Presidents

Honours

National Team (Men)

 Summer Olympics
 Eight (1) : 2012

 World Championship
 Fourth (1) : 2005
 World Cup
 Runner-up  (1) : 2006

 African Championship  (Record) 
 Champions  (10) : 1974, 1976, 1979, 1994, 1998, 2002, 2006, 2010, 2012, 2018
 Runner-up  (8) : 1985, 1992, 1996, 2004, 2008, 2014, 2016, 2020
 Third Place  (6) : 1981, 1983, 1987, 1989, 1991, 2000

 African Games
 Runner-up  (1) : 1978
 Third Place  (2) : 1965, 2007

 Mediterranean Games 
 Runner-up (2)  : 2001, 2018
 Third Place (4)  : 1967, 1979, 2005, 2009

 Pan Arab Games
 Champions  (1) : 1985
 Third Place  (2) : 1992, 2011

National Team (Women)

 Summer Olympics
 did not qualify

 World Championship
 Twelfth (1) : 1975

 African Championship
 Champions  (3) : 1974, 1976, 2014
 Runner-up  (5) : 1981, 2006, 2010, 2012, 2016
 Third Place  (3) : 2000, 2002, 2021

 African Games
 Third Place  (1) : 1978

 Pan Arab Games
 Champions  (1) : 1985
 Runner-up  (3) : 1992, 1999, 2011

National Junior team (Boys)

 Junior World Championship
 Third Place  (1): 2011

 African Junior Championship
 Champions  (4) : 2002, 2008, 2012, 2016
 Runner-up  (8): 1980, 1998, 2000, 2004, 2006, 2010, 2014, 2018
 Third Place  (5): 1986, 1988, 1990, 1992, 1996

National Youth team (Boys)

 Youth World Championship
 Fourth Place (1): 2009

 African Youth Championship
 Champions  (1): 2016
 Runner-up  (5): 2004, 2008, 2010, 2012, 2018
 Third Place  (1): 2014

 Arab Youth Championship
 Champions  (3): 2012, 2017, 2019
 Runner-up  (1): 2023
 Third Place  (3): 1995,2013, 2015

 Maghrebian Youth Championship
 Champions  (1): 2019

National Junior team (Girls)

 Junior World Championship
 14th (1): 2001

 African Junior Championship
 Champions  (1): 2019
 Runner-up  (5) : 1992, 2000, 2004, 2009, 2015
 Third Place  (2): 2011, 2013

National Youth team (Girls)

 Youth World Championship
 11th (1): 2006

 African Youth Championship
 Runner-up  (2) : 2013, 2017
 Third Place  (1): 2011

Beach National Team (Men)
 Mediterranean Beach Games
 Champions (1)  : 2015

 African Beach Games
 Champions (1)  : 2019

Beach National Team (Women)
 Mediterranean Beach Games
 Fourth (1) : 2015

 African Beach Games
 Champions (1)  : 2019

See also
Tunisia men's national handball team
Tunisia women's national handball team
Tunisia men's national junior handball team
Tunisia men's national youth handball team
Tunisia women's national junior handball team
Tunisia women's national youth handball team

Other handball codes
 Tunisia national beach handball team
 Tunisia women's national beach handball team

References

External links
Tunisian Handball 
Tunisian Handball Info 

African Handball Confederation
Handball in Tunisia
Handball
Sports organizations established in 1956